Myint Myat (born 7 August 1986)  is a Myanmar Motion Picture Academy Awards-winning Burmese actor. He began his career in June 2006.

Selected filmography

Film (Cinema)

Kyauk Sat Yay (2009)
Ko Tint Toh Super Yat Kwat (2014)
Chit San Eain 2028 (2015)
Khoe Soe Lu Hnite (2016)
Yazawin Yine Thu Myar (2017)
Taw Kyi Kan (2017)
Kyun (2017)
Original Gangster 2: Black Area (2017)
Mhaw Kyauk Sar (2018)
Dar Nga Pyuu (2018)
Baw Baw Ka Htaw (2018)
Mingalar  Katin (2018)
Yoma Paw Kya Tae Myet Yay (2019)
Kyar Kyar Kyite Kyite (2019)
A Chit Sone Crush? (2019)
Hero (2019)
Players (2020)
Mite Mae Chit (2020)

Awards and nominations

Personal life
He is married to Khin Thu Aung in 2017.

References

1986 births
Living people
Burmese male film actors
21st-century Burmese male actors